Geovana Peres vs Claire Hafner was a world title fight that took place on 4 October 2019 at SkyCity Convention Centre in Auckland, New Zealand. Peres won the fight by referee stoppage between the 8th and 9th round. This was considered a history making moment as Geovana Peres was the first New Zealand female boxer to win and successfully defend a world title in her home country. Geovana Peres was also the first LGBT person representing New Zealand to hold a world boxing title. Claire Hafner was born in the USA but considers herself a Canadian. She came into the fight ranked first on Boxrec, above Geovana who was ranked second. The winner of the fight would also be recognized as the official Lineal World Heavyweight champion.

History

Background
Geovana Peres won her WBO World Light Heavyweight title on 30 March against Lani Daniels, which was dubbed "history in the making".  Peres won the fight by unanimous decision. Claire Hafner won her first boxing title fight on 29 September 2018 against former world number one Sonja Fox, winning the ABO American female heavyweight title. Claire reached the top ranking after she defeated former WBC world title contender Carlette Ewell on June 15, 2019. Claire Hafner dropped down in weight for the fight against Peres, losing 9 kg.

On 5 May 2019, Bruce Glozier announced that he was in negotiations for Geovana Peres' first world title defence with Claire Hafner. Shortly after, it was announced that Steve Deane had joined Bruce Glozier to form a new company called Rival Sports Promotion. At this time they signed a three-fight deal with both Geovana Peres and Lani Daniels. On 31 July, it was announced that the fight between Peres and Hafner was official. To promote the fight Peres set a record by doing boxing pad training on top of the Auckland Sky Tower 193 metres in the air.

Leading up to the event it was noted that no fights or training material from Claire Hafner were available on the internet. For this reason Peres had to literally train for everything, as they did not know what to expect. Peres had some fight footage online which gave Hafner material to study and train with. A few days before the fight, the two boxers met each other for the first time at a media and photo shoot at Cheltenham Beach. Hafner told the media that her opponent was exactly what she had expected and that she was very confident leading into the fight.

Fight Card

Fight details 
Geovana Peres vs Claire Hafner was held at SkyCity Convention Centre in Auckland, New Zealand. Tickets for the fight went on sale on 31 July 2019 after Bruce Glozier announced that general admission and corporate tables tickets would start at $65. Rival Sports Promotion elected to distribute the tickets themselves through the event Facebook page and their website. They sold out the event with a little over 1000 tickets between general admission and corporate tables.

The fight announcer was Daniel Hennessey. Singapore born Australian Phil Austin served as the in-ring referee and New Zealanders Arden Fatu and Ioana Schwalger, along with Australian Chris Condon, were the ringside judges. Danny Leigh served as the supervisor and representative for the WBO.

Before the event began, the national anthems of Canada and New Zealand were sung. Claire Hafner sang the Canadian national anthem before her fight.

Broadcasting 
It was announced that the event would be televised through Sky Sports on Sky TV, with a live broadcast. It was also announced that Samoa would broadcast the fight live on Samoa TV3.

Weigh in 
On 3 October 2019 the weigh in was held at Skycity Auckland at Sammy's, which is located on the gaming floor in the casino.

Recap

Aftermath
After the fight Geovana Peres was interviewed in the ring. "It feels dream-like. This is for us New Zealand... I'm proud to be a Kiwi now. This is ours and it will stay here... The only thing that was missing was a TKO and I have it now. I'm going to get better... I don't know what will happen next. That's for my manager now. Back to training and set some goals for next year." On 26 January 2021, it was announced that Geovana Peres had officially retired from boxing, ending her career as a world champion. On the 16 April 2021, Geovana Peres made her amateur muay thai fight debut against IFMA Junior Gold Medalist and GAMMA World Champion Roezala Su’e. On the 13th of August, Peres won her first kickboxing fight against Gina Gee. Peres won the fight by unanimous decision with her winning the inaugural Fau Vake Warrior's Heart Memorial Shield.

References

Boxing matches
2019 in women's boxing
October 2019 sports events in New Zealand
Boxing in New Zealand
Sport in Auckland